Damuchal (also Romanized as Dāmūchāl; also known as Damchāl) is a village in Rudboneh Rural District, Rudboneh District, Lahijan County, Gilan Province, Iran. At the 2006 census, its population was 261, in 82 families.

References 

Populated places in Lahijan County